Within a Mile of Home is the third studio album by the Celtic punk band Flogging Molly. Released in 2004, the album reached No. 20 on the U.S. Billboard Top 200 chart and No. 1 on the Independent Music chart. The album is dedicated to Joe Strummer and Johnny Cash, as indicated in the album's liner notes. The song "To Youth (My Sweet Roisin Dubh)" was featured on the soundtrack of FIFA Football 2005.

Reception 

In their review, AllMusic noted Flogging Molly's "more mature, more polished" sound on this album and its stylistic variations. They pointed to the Cajun-influenced accordions on "Tomorrow Comes a Day Too Soon", the a capella performance on "The Wrong Company" and guest Lucinda Williams' guest appearance on "Factory Girls" as evidence of this. The reviewer also appreciated the album's varied themes which include modern-day U.S. policy concerns ("Screaming at the Wailing Wall") and Oliver Cromwell shipping Irish workers to Barbados during the 17th century ("Tobacco Island"). In another positive review, Punknews.org said that Flogging Molly "have a mastery of the traditional sound, and their harder and faster songs are definitely a lot of fun." The reviewer for PopMatters had high praise for the album. The review referred to the opening track "Screaming at the Wailing Wall" as a "toe-tapping, arm-in-arm Celtic boogie tune" and the following song "The Seven Deadly Sins" as a "kitchen-party Celtic assault". The review also noted that the song "To Youth (My Sweet Roisin Dubh)" sounds like a "Dublin-ized Mike Ness of Social Distortion" and that "The Wanderlust" as a combination of The Clash and The Pogues.

Track listing 

Track information and credits verified from the album's liner notes.

Personnel 
Flogging Molly
Dennis Casey – electric guitar, backing vocals
Matt Hensley – accordion, concertina
Dave King – lead vocals, acoustic guitar, banjo, bodhran, spoons, backing vocals
Nathen Maxwell – bass, backing and lead (10) vocals
Bridget Regan – fiddle, tin whistle, uilleann pipes, backing vocals
Bob Schmidt – mandolin, banjo, bouzouki, backing vocals, mandola
George Schwindt – drums, percussion
Additional musicians
Stephanie Fife – cello on track 5
Craig Jackman – washboard on track 9
Novi Novog – viola on track 5
Noel O'Donovan – additional vocals on track 13
Lee Thornburg – horns on track 15
Lucinda Williams – additional vocals on track 3

Charts

References 

2004 albums
Flogging Molly albums
SideOneDummy Records albums
Albums produced by Ted Hutt